The 2018–19 season was Szombathelyi Haladás's 63rd competitive football season, 11th consecutive season in the OTP Bank Liga and 99th year in existence as a football club.

Players 
As of 6 June 2018.

 

Players transferred during the season

Summer

In:

Out:

Winter

In:

Out:

Statistics

Appearances and goals
Last updated on 19 May 2019.

|-
|colspan="14"|Youth players:

|-
|colspan="14"|Out to loan:

|-
|colspan="14"|Players no longer at the club:

|}

Top scorers
Includes all competitive matches. The list is sorted by shirt number when total goals are equal.
Last updated on 19 May 2019

Disciplinary record
Includes all competitive matches. Players with 1 card or more included only.

Last updated on 19 May 2019

Overall
{|class="wikitable"
|-
|Games played || 38 (33 OTP Bank Liga and 5 Hungarian Cup)
|-
|Games won || 11 (8 OTP Bank Liga and 3 Hungarian Cup)
|-
|Games drawn || 7 (6 OTP Bank Liga and 1 Hungarian Cup)
|-
|Games lost || 20 (19 OTP Bank Liga and 1 Hungarian Cup)
|-
|Goals scored || 40
|-
|Goals conceded || 55
|-
|Goal difference || -15
|-
|Yellow cards || 102
|-
|Red cards || 5
|-
|rowspan="1"|Worst discipline ||  Murtaz Daushvili (10 , 0 )
|-
|rowspan="1"|Best result || 3–0 (H) v Puskás Akadémia - Nemzeti Bajnokság I - 30-03-2019
|-
|rowspan="1"|Worst result || 0–4 (A) v MTK Budapest - Nemzeti Bajnokság I - 8-12-2018
|-
|rowspan="1"|Most appearances ||  Funsho Bamgboye (36 appearances)
|-
|rowspan="1"|Top scorer ||  Tamás Priskin (7 goals)
|-
|Points || 40/114 (35.09%)
|-

Nemzeti Bajnokság I

League table

Matches

Results summary

Results by round

Hungarian Cup

Friendly games (2018)

Friendly games (2019)

References

Hungarian football clubs 2018–19 season
Szombathelyi Haladás seasons